The Blendkörper 2H was a non-lethal smoke grenade that was developed by Germany and used by the Wehrmacht during World War II.

Design
The Blendkörper 2H was similar to the earlier Blendkörper 1H in concept and construction.  The Blendkörper 2H was roughly the size of a light bulb but made from thicker glass and consisted of two glass bulbs filled with liquid and sealed with plaster of paris.  The grenade was used to temporarily blind the crews of pillboxes and vehicles.  When the bulb burst the mixture vaporized and gave off a thick white smoke.  The outer vial contained  of titanium tetrachloride while the inner vial contained  of calcium chloride.  A downside of the Blendkörper 1H was that it didn't work well with low humidity and this was addressed by the Blendkörper 2H.  A notice on the side of the container for four grenades, says that they are suitable for use at temperatures down to -40°.

References

Grenades of Germany
World War II weapons of Germany
Smoke grenades